Thomas Gilbert may refer to:

 Thomas Gilbert (architect) (1706–1776), British architect
 Thomas Gilbert (military officer) (1715–1797), American Revolution figure
 Thomas Gilbert (engineer) (1927–1995), American engineer
 Thomas Gilbert (pioneer) (1786–1873), South Australian pioneer
 Thomas Gilbert (politician) (1720–1798), British politician
 Thomas Gilbert (sea captain), who spotted the islands of Gilbert and Ellice Islands, now in Kiribati, which are named after him
 Thomas Gilbert (minister) (1613–1694), English ejected minister
 Tom Gilbert (ice hockey) (born 1983), American ice hockey player
 Tom Gilbert (politician) (1926–2016), Canadian politician
 Tom Gilbert (rugby league) (born 2000), Australian rugby league player
 Eddie Gilbert (wrestler) (Thomas Edward Gilbert, Jr., 1961–1995), American professional wrestler and booker
 Marcus Thomas Pius Gilbert (born 1977), also known as Tom Gilbert, British evolutionary biologist
Thomas Gilbert (gangster), member of the Peaky Blinders street gang